Jim Reed (February 21, 1926 – June 29, 2019) was a NASCAR Grand National driver.

Career 
His total career earnings are $16,299 ($ when adjusted for inflation). Reed's biggest win came in the 1959 Southern 500 driving a 1957 Chevrolet Bel Air. Reed finished the highest in championship standings in 1959 (9th place overall) and the lowest in 1963 being 139th place overall for the year. His average career start was 12th and his average career finish was 16th. A wreck while driving a Ford late in the 1963 Grand National season caused a broken vertebra; Reed eventually retired from NASCAR. At Heidelberg Raceway, Reed won a race that took place on July 21, 1959, on a ¼-mile dirt track.

Reed performed the best at short tracks and restrictor plate tracks; finishing 11th on average while finishing in 34th on average while driving on tri-oval intermediate tracks.

Later life and death 
In 1965, Reed left the motorsports scene to start a truck dealership. While it started out as a GMC dealership, the business eventually moved on to selling Mitsubishi and UD trucks. Sales have mostly been either the first or second best in the Peekskill, New York region.

Reed died in his sleep on June 29, 2019, succumbing to a heart attack.

References

External links

1926 births
2019 deaths
NASCAR drivers
People from Marion, Illinois
Racing drivers from Illinois